Internet abuse refers to improper use of the internet and may include:

Cyberbullying, use of the internet to bully and intimidate. 
Cybercrime, use of computers in criminal activity
Cybersex trafficking, the live streaming of coerced sexual acts and or rape
Malware, software designed to harm a user's computer, including computer viruses
Spamming, sending unwanted advertising